Dik El Mehdi is a village, at 325 meters elevation, in the Matn District governorate of Mount Lebanon. Its population has been estimated at 2,096 by Aayroun. The village is around 18 km. from Beirut. The majority of it inhabitants derives from the Ashkar family. Many of its inhabitants come from various regions in Lebanon covering diverse political beliefs.

Dik el Mehdi has an elementary, high and secondary school "Collège des Frères Maristes Champville".

References

Populated places in the Matn District
Maronite Christian communities in Lebanon